Osa is the name of several inhabited localities in Russia.

Urban localities
Osa, Perm Krai, a town of district significance in Osinsky District of Perm Krai

Rural localities
Osa, Irkutsk Oblast, a selo in Osinsky District of Irkutsk Oblast
Osa, Kirov Oblast, a village in Makaryevsky Rural Okrug of Kotelnichsky District of Kirov Oblast